José Eduardo de Barros Dutra (11 April 1957 – 4 October 2015) was a Brazilian businessman, geologist and politician. He joined Petrobras in 1983, and served as CEO from 2003 to 2005. From 2007 to 2009, Dutra led the fuel distribution unit at Petrobras. He was elected president of the Workers' Party in 2009, then returned to the company in 2012. He was elected to the Federal Senate in 1994 and served until his death from cancer in 2015.

References

1957 births
2015 deaths
Members of the Federal Senate (Brazil)
Petrobras
20th-century Brazilian geologists
Businesspeople from Rio de Janeiro (city)
Deaths from cancer in Minas Gerais
Workers' Party (Brazil) politicians
People from Sergipe
Presidents of the Workers' Party (Brazil)